Instituto Maristas Valladolid was founded by the Marist Brothers in 1941. It includes divisions from preschool through the university level. It is located in Morelia (formerly Valladolid), Michoacán, Mexico.

References  

Marist Brothers schools 
Catholic schools in Mexico
Educational institutions established in 1941
1941 establishments in Mexico